Epworth Hall can refer to:
 Epworth Hall (Gainesville, Florida)
 Epworth Hall (Perry, New York)

Architectural disambiguation pages